Galya "Galit" Devash (born ) is an Israeli female former volleyball player, playing as a central. She was part of the Israel women's national volleyball team.

Early life
Devash was raised in Israel, to a family of Jewish background.

She competed at the 2011 Women's European Volleyball Championship.

References

1986 births
Living people
Israeli women's volleyball players
Place of birth missing (living people)
Israeli Jews
Jewish women's volleyball players